Kurseong subdivision is a subdivision of the Darjeeling district in the state of West Bengal, India.

Subdivisions
Darjeeling district is divided into the following administrative subdivisions:

Police stations
Police stations in the Kurseong subdivision have the following features and jurisdiction:

Gram panchayats
Gram panchayats in Kurseong subdivision are :

 Kurseong block consists of rural areas only with 14 gram panchayats, viz. Gayabari–I, Shivakhola, St. Marry's–III, Seetong–III, Gayabari–II, St. Marry's–I, Seetong–I, Sukna, Gayabari–III, St. Marry's–II, Seetong–II, Pandu, Chimney–Deorali and Mahanadi.

Blocks
Community development blocks in Kurseong subdivision are:

Demographics

According to the 2011 census, Hindus numbered 90,031 and formed 65.82% of the population. Buddhists numbered 31,133 and formed 22.76% of the population. Christians numbered 9,639 and formed 7.05% of the population. Muslims numbered 3,011 and formed 2.20% of the population. Others numbered 2,979 and formed 2.17% of the population.

Education
Given in the table below (data in numbers) is a comprehensive picture of the education scenario in Darjeeling district, with data for the year 2012-13.

Note: Primary schools include junior basic schools; middle schools, high schools and higher secondary schools include madrasahs; technical schools include junior technical schools, junior government polytechnics, industrial technical institutes, industrial training centres, nursing training institutes etc.; technical and professional colleges include engineering colleges, medical colleges, para-medical institutes, management colleges, teachers training and nursing training colleges, law colleges, art colleges, music colleges etc. Special and non-formal education centres include sishu siksha kendras, madhyamik siksha kendras, centres of Rabindra mukta vidyalaya, recognised Sanskrit tols, institutions for the blind and other handicapped persons, Anganwadi centres, reformatory schools etc.

Educational institutions
The following institutions are located in Kurseong subdivision:
Kurseong College was established in 1967 at Kurseong.
Darjeeling Government Polytechnic College was established at Kurseong in 1978.
Eastern Forest Ranger’s College was established by the government of India at Kurseong in 1974 to train forest range officers.

Healthcare
The table below (all data in numbers) presents an overview of the medical facilities available and patients treated in the hospitals, health centres and sub-centres in 2013 in Darjeeling district, with data for the year 2012-13.:

.* Excluding nursing homes.

Medical facilities
Medical facilities in Kurseong subdivision are as follows:

Hospitals: (Name, location, beds) 
Kurseong Subdivisional Hospital, Kurseong, 100 beds
Dowhill Central Hospital, Dowhill, 40 beds
Latpanchar Chincona Plantation Hospital, Latpanchar, 12 beds
SB Dey TB Sanatorium, Kurseong, 334 beds

Rural Hospitals: (Name, CD block, location, beds) 
Sukna Rural Hospital, Kurseong CD block, Sukna, 30 beds

Primary Health Centres : (CD block-wise)(CD block, PHC location, beds)
Kurseong CD block: Bagora (10), Sittang (PO Shelpu) (4), Gayabari (4)

Legislative segments
As per order of the Delimitation Commission in respect of the delimitation of constituencies in West Bengal, the whole area under this subdivision, viz. Kurseong municipality and Kurseong block is part of the Kurseong assembly constituency of West Bengal. This constituency is an assembly segment of Darjeeling Lok Sabha constituency.

References

Subdivisions of West Bengal
Subdivisions of Darjeeling district